Ewa Gawryluk (born 13 December 1967 in Miastko, Poland) is a Polish actress.

A popular European film and theater actress, and widely known by her Ewa Hoffer ("Eve Hoffer") TV persona from Na Wspólnej ("The Common Folk"), Gawryluk graduated from Łódź National Higher School of Theatre and Film in 1991. She made her stage debut at the Contemporary Theatre in Warsaw, which she maintains close ties to the present day.  Ewa also appears in the Teatr Telewizji productions as well as the TVN network's daily soap opera in Poland.  She most recently appeared in Tango directed by Maciej Englert.

Partial filmography

Grzeszni i bogaci  - TV series 2009
Na Wspólnej - TV series 2003–present
Król przedmieścia - TV series 2002
When Grandpa Loved Rita Hayworth - 2001
Chłop i baba 
Klan - TV series 1998-1999
Żegnaj Rockefeller (Goodbye Rockefeller) - TV movie 1993

References

External links

1967 births
Living people
People from Miastko
Polish actresses
Polish film actresses
21st-century Polish actresses